Jassal is a surname with people belonging to the Jatt Sikh Community, Ramgarhia, and some from the Ravidas Community. Notable people with the surname include:

Kiran Jassal (born 1996), Malaysian model and beauty pageant titleholder
Raminder Jassal (?–2011), Indian diplomat
Jasleen Jassal (born 2001) A Fashion Photographer (Jasleen Singh Photography)
Samir Jassal Conservative candidate in Feltham and Heston and current councillor. Actively involved in Guru Ravidass Gurdwaras of U.K
Late Dev Jassal U.K based song writer and member of Guru Ravidass Gurdwara , Birmingham
Randy Jassal, Song Producer
 

Indian surnames